Marathon High School may refer to:

 Marathon High School (New York)
 Marathon School (Texas) - See Marathon Independent School District
 Marathon High School (Wisconsin)
 Marathon High School (Florida)